Warwick Furnace Farms is a historic district in northern Chester County, Pennsylvania that includes the ruins of an early iron furnace owned by Anna Rutter Nutt, widow of Samuel Nutt. The ironmaster's house and workers' houses, as well as a historic farmhouse and barns now used in the operation of a working farm. Anna Rutter Nutt was the daughter of Thomas Rutter, who erected the first ironwork in Pennsylvania. Samuel Nutt bought the original tracts of land for a Coventry with partners William Branson and Mordecai Lincoln, the great great grandfather of Abraham Lincoln. The furnace was managed by George Taylor when the first Franklin Stoves were cast here. The furnace operated through the 1860s and supplied the iron used in the iron-clad ship the USS Monitor during the Civil War. The 786 acre historic district was listed by the National Register of Historic Places in 1976.

A historical marker on the site reads:

Several other sites listed by the National Register of Historic Places are within a couple of miles of the site, including Hockley Mill Farm, to the east on Warwick Furnace Road, Warrenpoint to the north, Reading Furnace Historic District and Warwick Mills to the west, and Brower's Bridge upstream (west) on the South Branch of French Creek. Warrenpoint was owned by Nutt's partner William Branson and both are considered early iron pioneers.
 
In 2015, the French & Pickering Creeks Conservation Trust permanently protected the 553-acre Warwick Furnace Farm through conservation easements and the acquisition of 108 acres, which will be the future home of a public preserve.

See also
 National Register of Historic Places listings in northern Chester County, Pennsylvania
 List of Washington's Headquarters during the Revolutionary War
 Reading Furnace
 Robert Grace

References

Houses on the National Register of Historic Places in Pennsylvania
Houses completed in 1737
Houses in Chester County, Pennsylvania
Historic districts on the National Register of Historic Places in Pennsylvania
National Register of Historic Places in Chester County, Pennsylvania
Farms on the National Register of Historic Places in Pennsylvania